Aleksander Leopold Raudkepp (16 March 1877 Ambla Parish (now Järva Parish), Kreis Jerwen – 1948 Germany) was an Estonian politician and Lutheran clergyman. He was a member of the I, II, III, IV and V Riigikogu.

1923-1924 he was Second Assistant Chairmen and 1925-1926 First Assistant Secretary in II Riigikogu.

References

1877 births
1948 deaths
People from Järva Parish
People from Kreis Jerwen
Estonian Lutheran clergy
Christian People's Party (Estonia) politicians
National Centre Party (Estonia) politicians
Members of the Riigikogu, 1920–1923
Members of the Riigikogu, 1923–1926
Members of the Riigikogu, 1926–1929
Members of the Riigikogu, 1929–1932
Members of the Riigikogu, 1932–1934
University of Tartu alumni
Estonian World War II refugees
Estonian emigrants to Germany